Rai Ranga Rao was (born T. Ranga Rao, also spelt Ranga Row) was an Indian administrator and statesman who served as Diwan of Travancore 18371838. He was the father of Sir T. Madhava Rao, brother of R. Venkata Rao and paternal uncle of R. Raghunatha Rao.

References

Year of death missing
Diwans of Travancore
People from Thanjavur district
Year of birth missing